The 1964–65 Football League season was Birmingham City Football Club's 62nd in the Football League and their 38th in the First Division. Having replaced Gil Merrick as manager with coach Joe Mallett, newly arrived from Nottingham Forest, they finished bottom of the 22-team division so were relegated to the Second Division for the 1965–66 season. They lost their opening match in each of the cup competitions, to West Ham United in the third round proper of the 1964–65 FA Cup and to Chelsea in the second round of the League Cup.

Twenty-six players made at least one appearance in nationally organised first-team competition, and there were fifteen different goalscorers. Half back Winston Foster played in all 44 first-team matches over the season, and Stan Lynn and Geoff Vowden finished as joint leading goalscorers with only 10 goals each, all scored in league competition. Eight of Lynn's ten goals were scored from the penalty spot.

Football League First Division

League table (part)

FA Cup

League Cup

Appearances and goals

Players with name struck through and marked  left the club during the playing season.

See also
Birmingham City F.C. seasons

References
General
 
 
 Source for match dates and results: 
 Source for lineups, appearances, goalscorers and attendances: Matthews (2010), Complete Record, pp. 364–65.
 Source for kit: "Birmingham City". Historical Football Kits. Retrieved 22 May 2018.

Specific

Birmingham City F.C. seasons
Birmingham City